Beula may refer to:

Jak Beula (born 1963), British entrepreneur
Johana Harris (1912–1995), Canadian pianist, composer and music educator born Beula Duffy
Beula Nunn (1914-1995), wife of former Kentucky Governor Louie B. Nunn and preservationist 
Beula, Pennsylvania, Cambria County - see List of places in Pennsylvania

See also
Beulas, a coachbuilder based in Spain
Beulah (disambiguation)